Limelite, Luv & Niteclubz is the fourth studio album by American rapper Da Brat. It was released by So So Def and Arista Records on July 15, 2003 in the United States. The album included the single "In Love wit Chu" featuring Cherish.

Singles
Released on June 8, 2003, "In Love wit Chu" featuring R&B group Cherish served as the lead single from this album. The song peaked at number nine on Billboards Rhythmic chart. The music video features cameo appearances by Mariah Carey, boxer Roy Jones Jr., and Jermaine Dupri. A second single "Boom", was released on August 5, 2003.

Critical reception

AllMusic editor Andy Kellman rated the album three out of five starts. He found that "there's no getting past the fact that the album is just as pockmarked with average material as Unrestricted. Despite this, no song is certifiably weak."

Commercial performance
Limelite, Luv & Niteclubz reached reached at number 17 on the US Billboard 200. It also peaked at number six on the Billboard Top R&B/Hip-Hop Albums.

Track listing 

Notes
 signifies a co-producer

Sample credits
 "Gotta Thing for You" contains replayed elements from "What You Won't Do for Love" (1978) as performed by Bobby Caldwell.
 "Who I Am" contains re-sung elements from "Cha Cha Cha" (1989) as performed by MC Lyte.
 "Boom" contains re-sung elements from "Boom! I Got Your Boyfriend" (1988) as performed by MC Luscious.
 "Got It Poppin'" contains excerpts from "Darryl And Joe (Krush-Groove 3)" (1985) as performed by Run DMC.

Charts

References

2003 albums
Da Brat albums
Arista Records albums
Albums produced by Jermaine Dupri
Albums produced by L.T. Hutton